San Martino dei Bianchi is a Roman Catholic church located on corso Vittorio Emanuele #191 (also entrance Via San martino 24) in the center of the city of Catania, Sicily, southern Italy.

History and Description
The present church with its undulating late-Baroque facade was built in the 18th century, commissioned by the Arch-confraternity of the Bianchi, using designs by the architect Stefano Ittar (1724-1790). The prior church of the lay confraternity had been destroyed by the 1693 earthquake. The confraternity provided comfort and burial assistance to those condemned to death. Further down along Via San Martino, at the number 10, on the second floor is a plaque recalling the inn where Goethe stayed during his Italian Journey through Catania in 1787.

References

18th-century Roman Catholic church buildings in Italy
Roman Catholic churches in Catania